Diego Hurtado de Mendoza y Manrique, 4th Marquis of Cañete was a Spanish nobleman.

He was the son of Don Andrés Hurtado de Mendoza, 3rd Marquis of Cañete and of Magdalena Manrique, daughter of García Fernández Manrique, 3rd Count of Osorno. Diego Hurtado de Mendoza married twice: first to Margarita Pujadas, with whom he had a daughter; and later to his cousin Isabel de Mendoza. After his death, his title was inherited by his younger brother García.

Ancestry

Additional information

Notes

Sources

Diego 04
Knights of Santiago
Diego 04
16th-century Spanish nobility